Parum is monotypic moth genus in the family Sphingidae erected by Walter Rothschild and Karl Jordan in 1903. Its single species, Parum colligata, was first described by Francis Walker in 1856.

Distribution 
Is found from Korea and Japan south throughout eastern and central China and Taiwan to Vietnam, northern Thailand and north-eastern Myanmar.

Description 
The wingspan is 69–90 mm.

Biology 

There are one or two generations per year in northern China, with adults on wing from May to July. Farther south, there may be up to four generations. Adults have been recorded from mid-May to late September in Korea.
The larvae have been recorded feeding on Broussonetia kaempferi, Broussonetia papyrifera and Morus alba in Guangdong. Other recorded food plants include Broussonetia kazinoki and Maclura fruticosa.

References

Smerinthini
Monotypic moth genera
Moths of Asia
Taxa named by Walter Rothschild
Taxa named by Karl Jordan